Yang Qingning (b. 5 November 1998), native name: Yang Yan, English name: Devbor), is a Chinese Internet celebrity, Kuaishou and former camgirl. She once had many fans in Kuaishou, but was later banned after she was criticized by China Central Television for having a child out of wedlock and using a live broadcast platform for speculation. She is mainly active in Sina Weibo and shows her own photos.

Career 
In 2014, Yang Qingning, at age 16, joined the network broadcast platform and opened Sina Weibo. She gradually became known to the public by launching online live broadcasts in Kuaishou and sharing her photos on Weibo.

In 2017, Yang Qingning began her singing career. On June 14, her first song "We" was released online. Yang and her then-boyfriend Wang Lele provided the vocals. On September 30, she issued her first solo single "Four and a half years". From October to December, she released more songs, such as "Little Sun, If There is No If, A Little Princess".

In March 2018, she issued her second solo single, "Loving Your Smile".

In early 2018, Yang Qingning invested in ifashion, a brand owned by Taobao, and set up an online store on Taobao mall, mainly selling women's fashion.

Personal life 
On June 26, 2017, she gave birth to a son named Xiao Nezha with her then-unmarried boyfriend Wang Lele.

Controversy 
At the end of March 2018, Yang Qingning and her boyfriend, Wang Lele, were criticized by CCTV for showing their children on the Kuaishou live broadcast. Shortly after the broadcast, the accounts of Yang Qingning and Wang Lele were banned by the official of Kuaishou.

Discography

References

External links 
 
 杨清柠 - QQ音乐
 杨清柠 - 虾米音乐

1998 births
living people
Chinese Internet celebrities
Chinese women singers